Wharram railway station was opened by the Malton and Driffield Railway in May 1853, serving the village of Wharram-le-Street in North Yorkshire, England, although the area was in the East Riding of Yorkshire at the time. The station was also near the deserted medieval village of Wharram Percy and adjacent to Wharram chalk quarry.

The single platform station had a passing loop off its southern end, the only one on the line. It had the customary goods facilities for wayside stations, plus a siding into Wharram Quarry, dominated by a large chalk silo.

The line was originally conceived as part of a trunk route between Kingston-upon-Hull and the North East of England, but this came to very little. The station remained throughout its life as a country station on a country byway. These trains were nicknamed the "Malton Dodger". They usually had either one or two coaches, often strengthened by one or more horse boxes in this racing country. Before the Second World War, intermittent excursion traffic called at Wharram to view the station's floral displays and well as the area's scenery.

The station and line closed to passenger traffic in June 1950. Although it was said to be reasonably loaded on Saturdays (Market Days), it carried few people except schoolchildren otherwise. The line and station were reopened to passengers in February 1953 and February 1958 when the area's roads were impassable due to snow.

Freight traffic and occasional passenger specials continued until the line closed completely on 20 October 1958, the last pickup goods having called on the 18th.

The quarry had "followed a similar pattern to North Grimston - rapid expansion in the post-First World War boom, enormous output in the 1920s, declining in the 1930s and fizzling out after the Second World war." In 1919 a private siding was built in the quarry with exits in both directions onto the running line. Traffic growth was dramatic, peaking in 1925 with 107,261 tons of chalk forwarded to Thirsk, bypassing Malton as the line had originally been conceived. This was down to 38,562 tons in 1926 and to a mere 3,000 tons in 1929. The quarry closed in 1930. It reopened later in the 1930s, but its output was sporadic and small scale, mainly travelling by road in bags. Such rail traffic as there  mainly coal for the quarry's kilns. The quarry was disused by 1960 and has become a wildlife reserve.

The track was lifted shortly after closure, but the station building remained in use as a private residence. In 2005 the station's water tower remained in place.

References

Sources

Further material

External links

Station and line on navigable OS maps Rail Map Online
Station and line on navigable OS maps National Library of Scotland
Station and line on navigable 1947 OS map NPE Maps
Station and mileages on line MAD Railway Codes
Station and its history Yorkshire Wolds Railway

Disused railway stations in North Yorkshire
Railway stations in Great Britain opened in 1853
Railway stations in Great Britain closed in 1950
Former Malton and Driffield Junction Railway stations